The Screen Actors Guild Award for Outstanding Performance by a Male Actor in a Comedy Series is an award given by the Screen Actors Guild to honor the finest acting achievements by a male actor on a comedy television series. The award is for both lead and supporting characters.

Winners and nominees

1990s

2000s

2010s

2020s

Superlatives

Trivia

Multiple wins
 7 wins
 Alec Baldwin (consecutive)

 4 wins
 Tony Shalhoub (twice consecutive)

 3 wins
 Sean Hayes (2 consecutive)
 William H. Macy (2 consecutive)

 2 wins
 Michael J. Fox (consecutive)
 John Lithgow (consecutive)
 Jason Sudeikis (consecutive)

Single wins
 1 win
 Jason Alexander
 Ty Burrell
 Robert Downey Jr.
 David Hyde Pierce
 Jeffrey Tambor

Multiple nominees

 9 nominations
 Tony Shalhoub

 8 nominations
 Alec Baldwin
 Kelsey Grammer
 David Hyde Pierce

 7 nominations
 Ty Burrell
 Sean Hayes

 6 nominations
 Steve Carell

 5 nominations
 Jason Alexander
 Ray Romano

 4 nominations
 William H. Macy
 Jim Parsons

 3 nominations
 Louis C.K.
 Larry David
 Michael Douglas
 Peter MacNicol
 Jeremy Piven
 Michael Richards
 Eric Stonestreet

 2 nominations
 Anthony Anderson
 Alan Arkin
 Jason Bateman
 Peter Boyle
 Michael J. Fox
 Bill Hader
 Jason Lee
 John Lithgow
 Paul Reiser
 Charlie Sheen
 Jason Sudeikis
 Jeffrey Tambor

See also
 Primetime Emmy Award for Outstanding Lead Actor in a Comedy Series
 Primetime Emmy Award for Outstanding Supporting Actor in a Comedy Series
 Golden Globe Award for Best Actor – Television Series Musical or Comedy

External links 
 SAG Awards official site

Male Actor Comedy Series
 
Television awards for Best Actor